Custos is the Latin word for guard.

Titles 

 Custos rotulorum ("keeper of the rolls"), a civic post in parts of the United Kingdom and in Jamaica
 Custos (Franciscans), a religious superior or official in the Franciscan Order
 Custos (Under-sacristan), a Roman Catholic office

Other
 AB Custos, a Swedish investment company
 Custos, a fictional secret organization in the Japanese film series Towa no Quon

Music
 Custos, a symbol which indicates the pitch of the next note on the next line - see Mensural notation#Custos

Proverbs
The nominative and accusative plural form custodes is used in the proverbial phrase Quis custodiet ipsos custodes?, "Who has custody of the custodians?".

Latin words and phrases